Jānis Tīdemanis (1 October 1897 – 12 April 1964) was a Latvian painter. His work was part of the painting event in the art competition at the 1932 Summer Olympics, representing Belgium.

References

1897 births
1964 deaths
20th-century Latvian painters
Latvian painters
Olympic competitors in art competitions
People from Ventspils